Evgeny Khvostov (born May 28, 1981) is a Russian former professional ice hockey defenceman who most notably played for HC Yugra of the Kontinental Hockey League (KHL). After retiring from 17 seasons professionally, Khvostov remained with Yugra, as an assistant coach with their MHL club, before moving to the same role in KHL until he was released on September 29, 2017.

References

External links

Living people
Rubin Tyumen players
HC Yugra players
1981 births
Russian ice hockey defencemen
Sportspeople from Surgut